The Greek Orthodox Church of St. George of Piscataway, New Jersey is the largest Greek congregation in New Jersey. In 2016 the congregation celebrated its 100th Anniversary as well as the 43rd anniversary of its Greek Festival. Its 48th Annual Greek festival takes place May 20–23, 2021. The presiding Priest is The Very Reverend Archimandrites Nektarios Cottros since January 2018. The President of the Church is Mr. George Athanasopoulos.

History of St. George 
On July 19, 1917, the Greek Orthodox community of New Brunswick was incorporated. Sunday liturgies for the members of this new community were held on the second floor of the Eagles’ Hall, on the corner of Neilson and Church Streets and, as there was no permanent priest, a different priest officiated each Sunday.

Unfortunately despite the selfless contributions and untiring efforts of the early parishioners, the new community floundered. After about a year of existence, the Board of Trustees dissolved and Church services in the Eagles’ Hall were stopped.

Undaunted, a second group of determined men met in 1918 and discussed how to build a permanent Church. Thus the first St. George building fund was spear-headed by Nicholas Chilakos, John Stroumtsos, the Reverend Father Vasilios Daskalakis and Nicholas Konstantakos (who served as Treasurer). Against strong odds, these men undertook a major task of raising money for the new Church. Every single Greek business and every single Greek person were approached for funds to support the new church. And while this was occurring, church services were begun again, this time at the Christ Episcopal Church (also in New Brunswick). At the same time, a Greek School and a new Board of Trustees were formed. John Stroumtsos was President of the new Board.

The cost of the new Church was estimated to be $12,770 and the land on which it would sit would cost $1,300 (total: $14,079). A mortgage of $5000 was acquired by the new Board from the Middlesex Title Guarantee Company. The lot on which the new church would stand was located at 9 River Road in Highland Park. This was considered a prime location because of its central location and easy accessibility to people from surrounding towns. Construction began in 1918 and was completed in 1919. The total cost of this building was $12,770.00. Imbedded in the cornerstone of this building is a bottle containing the listing of the first Board of Trustees, Reverend Father George Spyridakis was the priest when the land was bought, but was later reassigned to the Newark community. The first priest of the newly built church was Father Daskalakis.

The early years of this community were difficult. The treasury often lacked the necessary funds to conduct the church's business and the community was called upon to give their time and talents. Examples of unselfish giving abound. Notable are the following: the first paint job was paid for by founder Gregory Mackaronis, Father Daskalakis personally paid for the essentials to outfit the “Ayia Trapeza” and Nicholas Costas would make repairs to the Church when needed. All gave gladly because they wanted a strong community. And because of efforts such as these, the community survived and grew.

The internal strife in Greece after World War I had an impact on the Highland Park community. Between 1921 and 1928, a rift developed in the community when parishioners took sides on the political issues affecting Greece. Although few records during those years exist, it has been recorded that as a result of the rift, there were two Greek schools and two different congregations that held religious services simultaneously. During this time the first Greek School was begun, a constitution was adopted, a choir was formed and the Philoptochos, St. Barbara, was begun. Eventually the rifts were resolved and the community moved forward into a post-war era.

The beginning of the World War II saw the flight of many young first- generation of Greek men of the New Brunswick community go to war. A few did not return. However, during this period, many of the original founders began to consider the growth of the St. George community in a post-war era. With veterans returning to the area and beginning their own families, the founders began thinking in terms of a new church building which would include a community center and classrooms for the Sunday school and Greek School. Thus at the general assembly meeting of December 3, 1944, a building fund committee was created for the purpose of soliciting funds for the construction of a new church and community center with classrooms.

In the years that followed, the fundraising committee continued it efforts. On May 18, 1954, the committee transferred $45,020 to the church treasury – the amount collected over the ten-year period. In March 1959 the general assembly authorized the board of trustees to appoint a committee to study the feasibility of building a new church and community center. On June 21, 1960, by an overwhelming majority, the general assembly voted to purchase the land located at the corner of River Road and Riverview Avenue. Upon this approval architect William A. Loumos was retained to begin drawing the plans and specifications as recommended by the Board. Finally, on January 22, 1961, the general assembly voted to approve the plans for a new church.

In any active and thriving church community, the spiritual guidance of the Priest is essential. Throughout the history of the Highland Park church there were several clergy that served the community. From the year of the first Priest, Father George Spyridakis (1918), through the tenure of Reverend Father Nicholas Triandaffillou, the community was served by 12 Priests. In 1930, the records show that 10 Priests served the community beginning with the tenure of Reverend Father Kanellos Kanellopoulos. Father Anthony N. Pappas, joined the community in January 1959 and, in additional to his clerical duties, served as religious consultant for the new church.
Groundbreaking ceremonies for the new Church were held on December 3, 1961. Shortly thereafter Rule Construction Company of New Brunswick began construction. Nine months later, in September 1962, volunteers painted the assembly hall and classrooms. Finally, on December 23, 1962, the first liturgy was held in the new service. Father Pappas blessed the rooms, assembly hall and Church and Communion was administered in the new Church. In March 1963, the Highland Park church was sold to the Byelorussian Autocephalic Orthodox Church of St. Mary of Zurovicy at a price of $30,000.

On May 25, 1969, the new Church was consecrated. The community grew quickly and it soon became evident that it was out-growing the Church building. In 1988 an addition was completed providing additional classroom and meeting room space. And, as the community grew, so did the need for a second priest. In 1991, Father John E. Constantine joined the community. Father Constantine served the community until 1995 when he left to continue his service in the U.S. Navy. The following fall, Father John Theodosion joined the community. Father's ordination into the priesthood was held in the Church 1996. And also in that year, the community celebrated the 45th anniversary of Father Pappas’ ordination to the priesthood. In 2001, Father Pappas reached a golden milestone, 50 years as a Priest! Father John Theodosion became Proistamenos in 2002 and served the community until April 2004. On May 1, 2004, the V. Rev. Archimandrite Alexander Kile was appointed as the new Proistamenos and served for almost seven years until March 2011 when Father Nicholas Pastrikos joined the community.

In writing any history of a community, it is difficult to write about the very early years in a few paragraphs. The sacrifices made by those first members cannot be understated. These people worked tirelessly, volunteered their talents, and gave of their time and money without complaint. Every effort on their part, either large or small, made the first Church that much stronger and gave us the impetus to move forward to another edifice when it became necessary. The founders left us with a legacy to continue into the new millennium and beyond.

Rutgers Football Parking 
Saint George offers convenient parking during Scarlet Knight home games. Their property on 34/36 Riverview avenue is also utilized. Parking includes tailgating and catered food for large groups and events. The Church is a 5 minute walk to the SHI stadium down the road.

St. George Athletics 
St. George has had Volleyball for Girls 12-18 and Basketball for boys 12-18 for many years. As of late, the Athletic program has flourished with the better organization led by Athletic Director Nick Kambitsis. The volleyball coach is John Papanastasiou. The junior basketball coach is athletic director Nick Kambitsis and the Senior Basketball Coach is John Lyssikatos. The coaches are dedicated and show care and determination, which clearly has rubbed off the players, showing lots of success in the past few years.

Junior Basketball 
The Junior Basketball team is for players ages 12 to 14, or 7th-9th grade. The head coach is Athletic Director Nick Kambitsis, and assistants are Dimitri Hantsoulis and Yianni Apostolakis. The team is spearheaded by Big 3 Evangelo Kambitsis, George Kostis and Manoli Kostis. All three boys are two-way players, playing for both the junior and senior team. The players split time between teams. The inaugural two-way players were Chris Vlahos and Dimitri Hirschman in 2019. 

On December 10th, 2022, the junior team won the championship with a starting lineup of Evangelos E. Kambitsis, Kosta Hantsoulis, Evan Siskopoulos, George Kostis and Manoli Kostis.

List of Coaches

Senior Basketball 

The Senior Basketball team is for players ages 14–18, or players 9th-12th grade. The Head Coach is John Lyssikatos, followed by assistant coaches Joe Hirschman and athletic director and Junior Head Coach Nick Kambitsis. The team captain is Dimitri Hirschman. The team's core four consists of Chris Vlahos, Dimitri Hirschman, Evangelos Kambitsis and his younger cousin, Evangelo Kambitsis.

On December 10th, 2022, the senior team won the championship with a lineup of Georgie Papadakis, Evangelos E. Kambitsis, Chris Vlahos, Dimitri Hirschman and Marko Hantsoulis.

Two Way Players 
Two way players are players on the junior team who are eligible to play on the senior team. You must be 14 years old or a freshmen in High School in order to be a two-way player.  The inaugural two-way players were Chris Vlahos and Dimitri Hirschman in 2019. Although Hirschman did not see the court too much, Vlahos was impactful in the teams 2nd place season in 2018-2019. In the 2021-2022 season, Kosta Hantsoulis, Manoli Kostis,  Evangelos E. Kambitsis and Markos Hantsoulis were two way players, however, Kambitsis and M. Hantsoulis saw the most minutes. In the 2022-2023 season, not much changed, as the two way players stayed the same, with Hantsoulis being eligible to be on the senior team full time.

Team Roster

Winless Era (2016-2018) 

During this time period, the Saint George Senior team went winless for 2 season in a row.

Chris Vlahos Era (2018-2023) 
The Chris Vlahos era of basketball has brought nothing but success for the St. George Basketball program. In the 2018–2019 season, the St. George Basketball team won second place in the GOYA south division, but falling just short, unable to win in the GOYA state tournament. The following season, the team won third place, falling short of making the State tournament. Missing the 2020–2021 season due to the Coronavirus Pandemic, the team has built a terrific season for 2021–2022, setting up what looks like a deep run going into the playoffs. Despite their success, The core Juniors being Chris Vlahos, Dimitri Hirschman, Evangelos Kambitsis, Andreas Hadjiloucas and Bizos lost to St. Barbara's in Tom's River. Going into their 2022-2023 Senior season, a much expanded roster with new prospects gives the team a chance to win it all before the class of 2023 graduates.

St. George Hall of Fame 
The following members of St. George are notable members of the community who donate their time and/or contribute largely to the community
Very Reverend Archamidrties Nektarios Cottros- Priest; 2018–present
Revered Father Anthony Pappas- Former Priest; 1959-2003
John Lyssikatos- President; 2021–2022 Basketball Coach; 2014–2016; 2018–present
George Athanasopoulos- President; 2018-2021; 2022-present
Toula Karamrkos- Greek School Principal
Detective Paul Stevens- Sunday School Principal
Jim Solomos- Beloved St. George Parishioner and Sunday School teacher
John Blazakis- Volunteer Alter Boy
Kosta Janitor- Former Janitor
George Hadjiloucas- Beloved GOYA Advisor
Nick Kambitsis- Athletic Director, JR. Basketball Head coach and SR. Basketball assistant coach

GOYA 

Goya, short for Greek Orthodox Youth Association of America is an organized group of kids 12–18, or 7th-12th grade that provides a large service to the church. GOYA is made up of over 50 kids. This youth group is to provide an environment where teenagers of St. George can experience, live, and learn their Orthodox Faith and Culture so that, as they grow and mature, both spiritually and physically, they will develop a commitment to God, the Greek Orthodox Faith and the Greek Orthodox Church. They meet on a monthly basis to discuss the many ongoing activities throughout the week. These include Basketball and Volleyball games and practices through the fall and winter, Greek dance practices and many more. Additionally, the GOYA is responsible for hosting successful fundraising events such as their yearly Taverna Night in December, which raises money for nonprofit organizations, as well as helping with the festival, which raises money for the church itself. The GOYA also has a yearly Olympic competition, where churches from all around New Jersey stay at Monmouth University during Memorial Day weekend to compete in Track and Field, Volleyball, Soccer and Swimming. The Soccer team has been very successful, winning 2 championships in 2018 and 2019 led by now Junior Andreas Hadjiloucas who won the 2019 MVP award after making the game-winning goal.

Cross Diving 
Instituted in Asbury Park in 1947 by the late Archbishop (and later Ecumenical Patriarch) Athenagoras, the 75-year old tradition of the Blessing of the Waters and Κατάδυσις of the Cross, also known as the “Cross Dive,” resumed on Sunday, September 18, 2022. Faithful from across the Metropolis of NJ joined His Eminence Archbishop Elpidophoros of America, His Grace Bishop Apostolos of Medeia, Chancellor V. Rev. Archimandrite Christoforos Oikonomidis, and clergy from the Metropolis for Divine Liturgy in the Great Auditorium of Ocean Grove before heading down to the beach.

“Here at the sea’s edge, by the power of the Holy, Precious and Life-giving Cross, we have the opportunity to sweeten much more than salt water. We can sweeten the very substance of our lives. The Cross renews our souls and heals our inner wounds. The Cross lifts up our weary souls and gives us strength. The Cross enables us to forgive ourselves and to forgive others. The Cross enables us to forgive ourselves and to forgive others. For as the Lord was being nailed to it, His first words were: 'Father, forgive them, for they know not what they do.' Therefore, let us all bow down deeply with reverent devotion, while glorifying Christ and venerating His Invincible Weapon of Peace – the Holy Cross. And remember: God is here; God is everywhere; God is always," said the Archbishop in his Homily. (Full Homily)

After the crosses were thrown in the water, Kosta Hantsoulis (Junior Boy) and Chris Vlahos (Senior Boy), both from Saint George in Piscataway, retrieved the Crosses.

See also
Saint Demetrios Greek Orthodox Church (Jersey City, New Jersey)

References

External links

Piscataway, New Jersey
Greek Orthodox churches in the United States
Eastern Orthodox churches in New Jersey
Greek festivals
Festivals in New Jersey